Texas Commerce Tower may refer to:
JPMorgan Chase Tower (Dallas), formerly known as Texas Commerce Tower
JPMorgan Chase Building (Houston), formerly known as Texas Commerce Tower
JPMorgan Chase Tower (Houston), formerly known as Texas Commerce Tower